Matteo Bugli (born 10 March 1983) is a retired Sammarinese footballer who played for the San Marino national football team.

External links

1983 births
Living people
Sammarinese footballers
San Marino international footballers
Association football midfielders
F.C. Domagnano players
A.S.D. Verucchio players
S.S. Murata players
S.S. Cosmos players
A.S. San Giovanni players